The Official Albums Streaming Chart is a weekly music chart in the United Kingdom which calculates the most popular albums on audio streaming sites.

Number ones

Notes

References

External links
Official Albums Streaming Chart Top 100 at the Official Charts Company

United Kingdom Streaming Albums
Streaming Albums 2019